Emilio De Rose (1939–2018) was an Italian dermatologist and socialist politician who served as the minister of public works for one year in the period 1987–1988. He was a member of the Italian Democratic Socialist Party (Partito Socialista Democratico Italiano; PSDI).

Biography
De Rose was born in Marano Marchesato, Cosenza, Calabria, on 27 March 1939. He worked in Verona as a physician. He was a member of the Italian Socialist Party, but resigned from the party and joined the PSDI. From 1975 to April 1978 he was the municipal councilor of Verona from the PSDI. 

He was elected to the Chamber of Deputies for the PSDI in 1983 and 1987. He served as the minister of public works from July 1987 to March 1988 in the cabinet led by Prime Minister Giovanni Goria. He was not re-elected to the Chamber in the following general election and returned to his profession as dermatologist.

Views and arrest
De Rose was a declared Freemason, being a member of a city lodge named after Franklin D. Roosevelt. In April 1993 De Rosa was arrested in Verona due to accusations of abusing power whilst serving as a member of ğarliament and as a member of the executive of the PSDI. He was jailed for fifteen days and later acquitted of all charges in November 2003.

Death
De Rose died in Verona in June 2018. A funeral ceremony was held in Sant’Eufemia on 13 June.

References

External links

20th-century Italian physicians
21st-century Italian physicians
1939 births
2018 deaths
Deputies of Legislature IX of Italy
Deputies of Legislature X of Italy
Italian Democratic Socialist Party politicians
Italian dermatologists
Italian Freemasons
Italian Ministers of Public Works
Italian Socialist Party politicians
People from the Province of Cosenza